Arthur Warren Overmyer (May 31, 1879 – March 8, 1952) was a U.S. Representative from Ohio, and a judge on the Ohio Court of Appeals.

Biography
Born near Lindsey, Ohio, Overmyer attended the public schools and also Lima Lutheran College. He taught school, and later graduated from the Ohio Northern University school of law at Ada in 1902. He was admitted to the bar in 1902 and commenced practice in Fremont, Ohio. He served as clerk of the Fremont Board of Health 1907-1910, and as city solicitor 1910-1914.

Overmyer was elected as a Democrat to the Sixty-fourth and Sixty-fifth Congresses (March 4, 1915 – March 3, 1919).
He was an unsuccessful candidate for reelection in 1918 to the Sixty-sixth Congress.
He was appointed judge of the Court of Common Pleas by Gov. A.V. Donahey April 10, 1926, and elected to that position in November of the same year. He was reelected in 1930 and served until his resignation on December 1, 1934, having been appointed by Gov. George White to a vacancy in the Ohio Sixth District Court of Appeals.

Overmyer was elected in 1936 for a six-year term. In 1942, he was chosen as chief justice of the nine courts of appeals of Ohio. He retired from the courts on February 8, 1943.
He resumed the private practice of law in Fremont, Ohio, until his retirement in 1951. He died in North Royalton, Ohio, March 8, 1952. He was interred in Four-Mile House Cemetery, near Fremont, Ohio.

Overmyer married Nina Zelden Preston of Hardin County, Ohio at Ada, Ohio, June 17, 1903. They had a son named Richard Preston Overmyer, born in 1904. He was exalted ruler of the Fremont lodge of the B.P.O.E., a Knights of Pythias, and a Lutheran.

References

Sources

1879 births
1952 deaths
People from Sandusky County, Ohio
Claude W. Pettit College of Law alumni
Judges of the Ohio District Courts of Appeals
People from Fremont, Ohio
Democratic Party members of the United States House of Representatives from Ohio